Hypostomus plecostomus, also known as the suckermouth catfish or the common pleco, is a tropical freshwater fish belonging to the armored catfish family (Loricariidae), named for the longitudinal rows of armor-like scutes that cover the upper parts of the head and body (the lower surface of head and abdomen is naked soft skin). Although the name Hypostomus plecostomus is often used to refer to common plecostomus sold in aquarium shops, most are actually members of other genera.

Suckermouth catfish are of little or no value as a food fish, although they are at least occasionally consumed over their native range. A demand exists for them, however, as a bottom cleaner in the aquarium trade.

Distribution and habitat 
This species' native range is tropical northeastern South America; it naturally occurs in northeastern Brazil, the Guianas, and Trinidad and Tobago. Confusingly, the name Hypostomus plecostomus (or Plecostomus plecostomus) has sometimes been incorrectly used for several more-or-less similar loricariid catfishes, both in the popular and scientific literature. For example, it has sometimes been suggested that it occurs in southern Central America, but this is an entirely separate species, Hemiancistrus aspidolepis (also known under another synonym, Hypostomus panamensis).

Some Loricariidae species have been widely introduced to several countries around the world and reported as H. plecostomus. It is erroneous, and the concerned species belong to the genus Pterygoplichthys (either P. pardalis, P. disjunctivus, P. anisitsi or P. multiradiatus). In the United States, a Pterygoplichthys species has been introduced to some regions in the South, most likely released by aquarists into the local waters. For example, they are present in a lake in the neighborhood of Hammock Trace Preserve in Melbourne, Florida. In Texas, reproducing populations occur in spring-influenced habitats of the San Antonio River (Bexar County), Comal Springs (Comal County), San Marcos River (Hays County), and San Felipe Creek (Val Verde County), as well as in drainage canals in the Rio Grande Valley and Houston.

The same identification issues have spread in the literature regarding the invasive catfishes in Taiwan, with H. plecostomus being one of the numerous names used to designate the species: DNA studies showed the alien fishes were actually P. pardalis and P. disjunctivus (that hybridise extensively).

H. plecostomus prefer to live in water between 72 and 86 degrees Fahrenheit (~22.2 to 30 degrees Celsius), with a pH between 6.5 and 7.5.

Diet 
Hypostomus plecostomus is named for its sucker-like mouth, which allows it to adhere to a surface, as well as to hold and rasp at food. This omnivorous species feeds on algae, aquatic plants, and small crustaceans.

Physiology 
Hypostomus plecostomus is one of many species of fish that is able to breathe air. Hypostomus plecostomus relies on its gills for respiration in normal and slightly hypoxic water, and the less oxygen present in the water, the more frequently it surfaces to breathe air. The air is taken to the stomach where the oxygen is absorbed, and the air can be kept in the stomach to increase buoyancy, which may help it to feed on vegetation.

In the aquarium 
H. plecostomus is one of a number of species commonly referred to as "plecostomus" or "common pleco" by aquarists. In captivity, however, a full-grown Hypostomus plecostomus only reaches 15 inches (38 cm) on average, which could be explained by the subpar oxygen levels in most home aquaria and other practices of bad fish husbandry. In the aquarium trade, this dark-colored, bottom-feeding, nocturnal catfish is often purchased for its ability to clean algae from fish tanks but also contributes a lot of waste to the nitrogen cycle. They are difficult for other fish to harass, both due to the semi-aggressive nature of the fish as well as its thick armor.

Invasive species 
In Bangladesh, the species, among some other suckermouth catfishes has become invasive. The government is currently on its way to impose a ban on the farming, hatchling production, breeding, marketing and trading of the fish. It has also raised serious concern in India.

Naming

Common names 
A large variety of common names is used to describe H. plecostomus, where plecostomus and the shortened "pleco" are interchangeable in all common names. The names include:
 algae sucker/eater
 pez diablo (devil fish)
 pleco
 janitor fish
 municipal fish – 'ikan bandaraya' in Malay
 suckermouth catfish
 sweeper fish – 'ikan sapu sapu' in Indonesian
 crocodile fish (not to be confused with Papilloculiceps longiceps, which is originally known as the crocodile fish or tentacled flathead)

Taxonomy 
The species' scientific name, Hypostomus plecostomus, is derived from the Latin hypo (meaning "under"), stoma (meaning "mouth"), and pleco (meaning "pleated").

Many of the common names used to identify Hypostomus plecostomus are also used for other species, which augments the confusion surrounding H. plecostomus and other Loricariidae such as H. punctatus, Pterygoplichthys multiradiatus and P. pardalis. In 2012, Weber, Covain, and Fisch-Muller showed the type series of Carl Linnaeus was heterogenous and comprised two species: H. plecostomus (for which the authors designate a lectotype) and H. watwata.

See also 
 List of freshwater aquarium fish species

References

Further reading 
 

plecostomus
Fish described in 1758
Taxa named by Carl Linnaeus
Fish of Brazil
Fish of Guyana
Fish of Suriname
Fish of Trinidad and Tobago
Fish of the Caribbean